"Machucando" is the third single by Daddy Yankee from his album Barrio Fino en Directo. Although it did not have a music video, it received much radio airplay and became one of Daddy Yankee's best-known songs. The song was written by Daddy Yankee himself and co-written by Eddie Ávila. It was produced by Luny Tunes.

Charts

Weekly charts

Year-end charts

References

2005 singles
Spanish-language songs
Daddy Yankee songs
Song recordings produced by Luny Tunes
2005 songs
Songs written by Daddy Yankee
Songs written by Eddie Dee